is a passenger railway station located in the city of Higashimurayama, Tokyo, Japan, operated by the East Japan Railway Company (JR East).

Lines
Shin-Akitsu Station is served by the orbital Musashino Line between Fuchūhommachi and Nishi-Funabashi, with some trains continuing to Tokyo via the Keiyō Line, and is situated 13.0 km from the western terminus of the line at Fuchūhommachi. It is located 400 m (a 4-minute walk) from Akitsu Station on the Seibu Ikebukuro Line, which provides a more direct service to central Tokyo.

Station layout

The station consists of two sub-surface side platforms serving two tracks, with a central bidirectional through track used by freight trains. The ground-level station building has a "Midori no Madoguchi" staffed ticket office.

The JR East Hachiōji Area training facility is located north of the track to the west of the station. A connection from the Musashino Line to the Seibu Ikebukuro Line also runs from west of the station.

Platforms

History
The station opened on 1 April 1973. With the privatization of JNR on 1 April 1987, the station came under the control of JR East.

Passenger statistics
In fiscal 2019, the station was used by an average of 39,069 passengers daily (boarding passengers only).

The passenger figures for previous years are as shown below.

Surrounding area

 Akitsu Station (Seibu Ikebukuro Line)
 Meiji Pharmaceutical University
 Tohsei Gakuen School
 Tama Zenshoen Sanatorium

See also
 List of railway stations in Japan

References

External links

 Shin-Akitsu Station information (JR East) 

Railway stations in Japan opened in 1973
Stations of East Japan Railway Company
Railway stations in Tokyo
Musashino Line
Higashimurayama, Tokyo